Questo pazzo, pazzo mondo della canzone is a 1965 Italian "musicarello" film written and directed by Bruno Corbucci and Giovanni Grimaldi.

Cast
Sandra Mondaini
Valeria Fabrizi
Aroldo Tieri
Alberto Bonucci
Margaret Lee
Vittorio Congia
Dana Ghia
Marina Morgan
Umberto D'Orsi
Halina Zalewska
 Carlo Pisacane
Andrea Aureli
Gianni Morandi as 	himself
  Dino as 	himself
Edoardo Vianello as 	himself 
Lucio Dalla as 	himself 
Nico Fidenco as 	himself
Gino Paoli as 	himself
Remo Germani as 	himself
Françoise Hardy as 	herself
Jenny Luna as 	herself
Petula Clark as 	herself
Luigi Tenco as 	himself
Little Tony as 	himself
Ricky Gianco as 	himself
Udo Jürgens as 	himself
Los Marcellos Ferial:	as	themselves (Music Group) 
Pellerani	as	themselves (Music Group)
Susanna Clemm as the female viking

External links
 
 Questo pazzo, pazzo mondo della canzone at Variety Distribution

1965 films
1960s Italian-language films
1965 musical comedy films
Films directed by Bruno Corbucci
Films directed by Giovanni Grimaldi
Musicarelli
1960s Italian films